The First Universalist Church in Wausau was designed by Alexander C. Eschweiler in Tudor Revival style and built in 1914 for the local Universalist congregation. It was added to the National Register of Historic Places in 1980.

References

Churches on the National Register of Historic Places in Wisconsin
Unitarian Universalist churches in Wisconsin
Churches in Marathon County, Wisconsin
Churches completed in 1898
1898 establishments in Wisconsin
National Register of Historic Places in Marathon County, Wisconsin
Universalist Church of America churches